Omophoita cyanipennis, the eight-spotted flea beetle, is a species of flea beetle in the family Chrysomelidae. It is found in the Caribbean Sea, Central América, North América and Colombia, Valle del Cauca .

Subspecies
These two subspecies belong to the species Omophoita cyanipennis:
 Omophoita cyanipennis cyanipennis (Fabricius, 1798)
 Omophoita cyanipennis octomaculata (Crotch, 1873)

References

Further reading

External links

 

Alticini
Articles created by Qbugbot
Beetles described in 1798